WBXP-LP was a low-powered television station that was licensed to and served Memphis, Tennessee. The station was a Sonlife Broadcasting Network affiliate that was owned by L4 Media Group. It operated on digital UHF channel 44.

The station's license was cancelled by the Federal Communications Commission on May 15, 2019.

Digital channels

References

External links

Low-power television stations in the United States
BXP-LP
Television channels and stations established in 1989
1989 establishments in Tennessee
Television channels and stations disestablished in 2019
2019 disestablishments in Tennessee
Defunct television stations in the United States
BXP-LP